Busal or Bosal (also written as Bosaal) is a village in the Mandi Bahauddin District of Punjab, Pakistan.

Geography
Busal is located in Jech Doab (the plain between the Rivers Jhelum and Chenab). Busal consists of seven settlements: Sukkha, Masoor, Nuryana, Jand, Nakkaywala, Chhanni Hashim and Rutowala. Busal Sukha is the cultural, population, and financial center of the Busal area.

History
The time period at which Busal was first settled is unknown, but local legend holds that the name of the founder was Busal, who settled in the area during the reign of Mughal Emperor Jalal ud-Din Muhammad Akbar (1542-1605) and had relations with the Emperor. The Emperor gave him a large estate called Sooba Busal. Busal had three sons named Sukkha, Masoor, and Noor, for which three of the settlements are named. An irrigation department rest house was built outside Busal in 1915, and a police station was established in 1935. A system of canals and irrigation channels was built between 1910 and 1944.

Demography
Busal has a large and fast-growing population. Due to road improvements, availability of telephone service, and the establishment of new schools, people from small neighboring villages have migrated to Busal. The number of registered voters in Busal is just above 25,000, suggesting that the total population is above 40,000.

The majority of the Busal population belong to Jat Gondal clan. Rajputs who migrated from the Karnal district of East Punjab (now a district in Haryana, India) make a significant part of the population. Syeds (Bukhari, Gilani & Kazmi) are also migrated families having great respect and active participation in Shia muslim activities. A small population of Pashtuns also exists. The small community of nomadic people which after converting to Islam are called Deendar are settled in suburban areas of Busal.

Busal has been known in the past for crime and conflict, mainly stemming from a lack of education. This has changed due to the education resulting from construction of government-funded schools.

Religion

Almost the entire population of Busal are Muslim, out of which 15-20% are Shi'a Muslims/15-20% Deobandi, while the rest are Brelvi Sunni. A Sufi saint during the British Raj, Mian Muhammad Panah, has a following in Busal and nearby villages.
Deoband madrassas Jamia Farooqia for boys and Jamia Ayesha Siddiqa lilbanat-ul-Islam for girls are also working in Busal Sukkha. There are also Shia Imam Bargahs and few Mosques,

Languages

Punjabi, with Shahpuri dialect, is the language predominantly spoken by the people of Busal. The Rajput community speaks their native language Haryanvi, a language closely resembling Urdu. Urdu is also spoken and understood by almost entire population.

Education

Although the literacy rate of Busal is very low by international standards, it is one of the highest in Mandi Bahauddin District. The literacy rate varies from family to family. Some people of Busal hold doctorate degrees while a large majority has never even visited a school. The literacy rate among females is low. A very good move in the direction for improvement of girls education is the construction of girls degree college near Bangla Busal.

Government Higher Secondary School Busal

Government Higher Secondary School Busal was established in 1905,Syed Karam Hussain Shah Bukhari of Badshah Pur was appointed as a teacher offering education up to the primary level only. In 1951, with the efforts of social workers like Hakeem Ghulam Ali, the school was promoted to the middle level. Ch. Batti Khan Busal, a venerated landowner, donated approximately 33 kanals of land for the project. In 1984, the school was upgraded to high school and in 1986 to intermediate level. Presently around 700 students are enrolled in the school.

Government Girls Degree college Busal Sukkha 
A grand building for Government Girls Degree college Busal Sukkah was built using a part of the land of Bangla Busal in 2013-2014. This college became functional in Year-2015 which is very interesting as Bangla Busal was built exactly 100 years before in Year-1915.

Recreation
Despite the fact that Busal is a large village, there is no recreational grounds or playground for children in or around it. Children usually use the school grounds and the graveyard for playing cricket.

A small canal passes from the east of the village and a larger one from the west side. There used to be recreational swimming in these canals, but now thanks to the villages located upstream, the canals are highly polluted and swimming is no longer an option.

Bangla Busal

Built by the irrigation department in 1915 during the British Raj, Busal Irrigation Rest House or Bangla Busal is located approximately 2 km from Busal Masoor and Sukha. At one time it was well maintained, with a variety of flowers and trees. It also served as a large bird sanctuary. The building and grounds have fallen into disrepair due to lack of interest on the part of the irrigation department, and from people taking things to use as building materials elsewhere. This example of classical architecture has turned into ruins and requires immediate attention to preserve it as a piece of heritage.
A Girls degree college has been built on part of the land of Bangla Busal.

External links
 Busal

Villages in Mandi Bahauddin District